Hugo Dellien was the defending champion and successfully defended his title after defeating Thiago Seyboth Wild 3–6, 6–3, 6–3 in the final.

Seeds

Draw

Finals

Top half

Bottom half

References

External links
Main draw
Qualifying draw

Challenger de Santiago - 1
2023 Singles